Algherese or Alguerese is the variant of  Catalan spoken in the city of Alghero ( in Catalan), in the northwest of Sardinia, Italy.

The dialect has its roots in 1372, when Catalan-speaking colonists were allowed to repopulate Alghero and expel the native population, after several revolts. Catalan was replaced as the official language by Spanish, then by Italian in the mid-18th century. Today the language has semi-official recognition alongside Italian.

Studies give an approximate number of 20,000 to 30,000 native speakers of the language worldwide. In communities where Algherese is spoken, Italian and Logudorese Sardinian are often used as well.

History 
Algherese is a regional dialect spoken by anywhere from 20,000 to 30,000 individuals, most of whom reside in the town of Alghero, located in the northwest of Sardinia. The language, though distinct, is initially derived from, and thus considered a variant of, the Catalan language. The origins of the language can be traced back to 1372, when Catalan invaders repopulated the city of Alghero after exiling the indigenous populations in Sardinia. Despite the city's increasing Italianization, the use of this Catalan dialect remained widespread until at least the 1970s.

Present status
As a result of the city's extensive Italianization, Italian is now the predominant language in Alghero, being estimated by a 2004 survey to be first language of close to 60% of those surveyed. The use of the dialect in schools and media, to name a few, remains sparse. Teaching of the dialect in school is also rare. However, in an attempt to reverse the trend, the Regional Council of Sardinia officially recognized "Algherese Catalan" as a separate language in 1997, in order to promote its use and circulation. According to the 2004 survey, Algherese was used by approximately 14% of the population for daily interactions. The dialect is mostly a local language, often used to supplement Italian and/or Sardinian in relatively small circles.

The following figures were obtained from the Enquesta d’usos lingüístics a l’Alguer ("Survey of linguistic usage in Alghero", EULAL) of 2004 and the Els usos lingüístics a l’Alguer of 2015 (EULA 2015), both of which were studies conducted in the town of Alghero about the general use of Algherese in several media.

Official recognition
In 1999, Catalan and Sardinian were among the twelve minority languages officially recognized as Italy's "historical linguistic minorities" by the Italian State under Law No. 482/1999. Prior to this, the Regional Council of Sardinia had passed the Regional Law No. 26 of 15 October 1997 which, aside from promoting the equality in dignity of the Sardinian language with the Italian language throughout the island, provided that the other languages of smaller scope be afforded the same treatment as the aforementioned languages, among which Catalan is cited, in the city of Alghero. The city council, for its part, promulgated its protection and standardization in its city statute.

Phonology

A narrow transcription is provided here to clarify the sounds of Algherese. Note that transcriptions elsewhere should use a broader transcription.

Algherese has these phonetic features :
Mutation of syllable final   to lateral , and the possible resulting group  + consonant is further simplified to : forn ('oven')  (Eastern Standard),  (Algherese).

Morphology 
The simple past is replaced by the present perfect (present of haver "to have" + past participle), possibly by Italian influence.
The imperfect past preserves etymological -v- in all conjugations: 1st -ava, 2nd -iva, 3rd -iva  unlike modern Eastern and Western Standard Catalan, which use 1st -ava, 2nd -ia, 3rd -ia, a feature shared with the Ribagorçan dialect.
Large-scale lexical borrowing and calques from Sardinian, Spanish and Italian: nearly half of the vocabulary is not from Catalan.

Differences from Standard Catalan
The Algherese variant is Eastern Catalan, but it has many differences from Central Catalan, with some of the most obvious ones as follows:

Vocabulary
The following abbreviations are used: m. (masculine), f. (feminine), pl. (plural), f. pl. (feminine plural), inf. (informal), f. (formal).

The following phrases were gathered from a Catalan translation set, but the common phrases in Algherese are similar:

Literature 

The Premi Rafael Sari, organised by the Obra Cultural de l'Alguer, is a series of prizes awarded in September each year to the best literary works of poetry and prose written in Algherese Catalan.

Notable poets include Rafael Sari, Pasquale Scanu and Maria Chessa Lai. There is also a long tradition of writing and performing songs in Algherese Catalan and the Premi Pino Piras is awarded for new songs written in the language. Notable singer-songwriters include Pino Piras and Franca Masu.

In 2015 Carla Valentino published an Algherese translation of Antoine de Saint-Exupéry's The Little Prince.

Notes

References

Sources 

 
 
 
 
 Ballone, Francesc (2008). L'Alguer and Alguerese Catalan. Corpus Oral de l'Algueres
 
 
 
 
 Cabrera-Callis, Maria (2015). Morphologically Conditioned Intervocalic Rhotacism in Algherese Catalan. Variations within and Across Romance Languages
 Moseley, Christopher (2016). Atlas of the World's Languages in Danger. United Nations Educational, Scientific and Cultural Organization
 Hammarstrom, Harald & Forkel, Robert & Haspelmath, Martin & Bank, Sebastian (2017). Dialect: Algherese. Glottolog
 Ager, Simon (1998–2017). Useful Catalan Phrases. Omniglot.
 Various Sources (2017). Algherese Catalan. The Endangered Languages Project

External links
 Diccionari d'alguerés
 Associació per a la Salvaguarda del Patrimoni Historico-cultural de l'Alguer
 Interactive Atlas of Romance Intonation, Catalan Alguerese
 Italy's Last Bastion of Catalan Languages Struggles to Keep It Alive, New York Times, 21 November 2016.

Catalan dialects
Languages of Sardinia
Endangered diaspora languages
Province of Sassari
Alghero
City colloquials